The Frederick S. Pardee RAND Graduate School (Pardee RAND) is a private graduate school associated with the RAND Corporation in Santa Monica, California. The school offers doctoral studies in policy analysis and practical experience working on RAND research projects to solve current public policy problems. Its campus is co-located with the RAND Corporation and most of the faculty is drawn from the 950 researchers at RAND. The 2018–19 student body includes 116 men and women from 26 countries around the world.

History
The school was founded in 1970 as the RAND Graduate Institute (RGI). The name of the school has been changed twice. In 1987, RGI became the RAND Graduate School. In 2004, the present name was adopted to honor the contributions of Frederick S. Pardee, a former RAND researcher and philanthropist. Charles Wolf Jr. served as founding dean from 1970 to 1997 and remained a professor at the school until his death in 2016.

In 2013, Pardee RAND launched the Pardee Initiative for Global Human Progress focusing on international development. The John and Carol Cazier Environmental and Energy Sustainability Initiative was started in 2014. Pardee RAND has developed partnerships with UCLA.

Academics
Pardee RAND offers the Doctor of Philosophy (Ph.D.) degree in policy analysis. The Master of Philosophy (M.Phil.) degree is awarded to students after two years of coursework and partial completion of the Ph.D. requirements. The first doctorate was awarded in 1974. As of August 2018, Pardee RAND has awarded 400 Ph.D. degrees and is the largest policy Ph.D. program in the United States.

The Pardee RAND curriculum includes courses in economics, statistics, operations research, political science, and the behavioral and social sciences. Public policy courses focus on issues such as social determinants of health, education, civil and criminal justice, national security, population and demographics, and international development.

On-the-job training
Pardee RAND students gain practical experience and earn their fellowships through on-the-job training as members of RAND's interdisciplinary research teams, initially as apprentices and later in roles of increasing responsibility and independence. Students can apply to work on current projects with clients in the public, private, and non-profit sectors. RAND's research areas include children and families, education and the arts, energy and environment, health and health care, infrastructure and transportation, international affairs, law and business, national security, population and aging, public safety, science and technology, and terrorism and homeland security.

Accreditation
Pardee RAND is accredited by the Western Association of Schools and Colleges (WASC). The school received its first accreditation in 1975 and was reaccredited in 2021 for 10 years (until 2030).

Noted people

Deans
 Charles Wolf Jr. (1970–1998)
 Robert Klitgaard (1998–2005)
 Rae Archibald (2005–2006, interim dean)
 John Graham (2006–2008)
 Molly Selvin (2008, interim dean)
 Susan L. Marquis (2009–2021)
 Nancy Staudt (2021–present)

Notable alumni
 Mark Albrecht – Former executive secretary of the National Space Council, former president, Lockheed Martin International Launch Services
 Ruopeng An - Associate Professor at the Brown School, Washington University in St. Louis.
 Tatiana Andreyeva - Associate Professor in the Department of Agricultural and Resource Economics and Director of economic initiatives at the University of Connecticut Rudd Center for Food Policy and Health 
 Yilmaz Arguden – Founder and chair, ARGE Consulting; founder, Argüden Governance Academy
 Bruce Bennett - International/Defense Researcher, RAND Corporation Professor, Pardee RAND Graduate School, and noted authority on North Korea.
 Yuhua Bao - Associate Professor of Population Health Sciences, Weill Cornell Medicine.
 Gordon Bitko – Executive vice president of policy, Information Technology Industry Council (ITIC) Former Chief Information Officer, United States Federal Bureau of Investigation
 Arthur C. Brooks – President Emeritus, American Enterprise Institute. William Henry Bloomberg Professor of the Practice of Public Leadership, Harvard Kennedy School.
 Cheryl Damberg - Director of the RAND Center of Excellence on Health System Performance, Distinguished Chair in Health Care Payment Policy, and Principal Senior Economist at the RAND Corporation. 
 Matthew Dixon – Director, Joint Reserve Directorate, Office of the Under Secretary of Defense for Research and Engineering.
 Richard Fallon – Former Vice-President and Chief Financial Officer, RAND Corporation
 Myong-Hyun Go - Senior Research Fellow at the Asan Institute for Policy Studies in Seoul, Korea.  Adjunct Professor at the Korea University School of Cybersecurity.
 Jay Griffin – Former chair, Hawaii Public Utilities Commission.
 Jeremy Ghez - Associate Professor of Economics and International Affairs, HEC Paris. Academic director of the HEC Paris Center for Geopolitics.
 Ted Harshberger – Vice-President, Studies and Analysis, Lockheed Martin Corporation. Former vice-president and director, Project Air Force, RAND Corporation.
 Yong Sup Han – Former vice president and director of the Korea National Defense University (KNDU) 
 Angela Hawken – Professor of public policy at the Marron Institute of Urban Management at New York University
 Owen Hill – Former legislator, Colorado State Senate
 Yong Sup Han – Former vice president and director of the Korea National Defense University (KNDU) 
 Alison Jacknowitz - Associate Professor and Chair of the Department of Public Administration and Policy, School of Public Affairs, American University.
 Xiaoyan (Shawn) Li, group director, Worldwide Health Economics and Outcomes Research, Bristol-Myers Squibb
 Elizabeth McGlynn - Vice President for Kaiser Permanente Research and Executive Director Kaiser Permanente Center for Effectiveness and Safety Research (CESR):
 Silvia Montoya - Director, UNESCO Institute for Statistics   
 Arnab Mukherjee - Professor, Center for Public Policy, Indian Institute of Management Bangalore, Founding Program Director, Mahatma Gandhi National Fellowship Program 
 Joseph Nation – former legislator, California State Assembly, professor of the Practice of Public Policy at Stanford University.
 Athar Osama – founder and CEO, Pakistan Innovation Foundation 
 Scott Pace – Executive Secretary of the National Space Council, former director of the Space Policy Institute at the Elliott School of International Affairs at George Washington University
 Jeffrey Peterson – Chair for the Study of Officership, Simon Center for the Professional Military Ethic, United States Military Academy.
 Lawrence Picus - Richard T. Cooper and Mary Catherine Cooper Chair in Public School Administration, Professor of Education, Finance, and Policy, and Associate Dean for Faculty Affairs, USC Rossier School of Education.
 Samantha Ravitch - Chairman of the Foundation for Defense of Democracies’ Center on Cyber and Technology Innovation and its Transformative Cyber Innovation Law, National Security Institute, George Mason University.
 Jack Riley -Vice president and director,  Homeland Security Research Division (HSRD) RAND Corporation.
 Philip Romero – Former Dean and Professor of Finance, Charles H. Lundquist College of Business, University of Oregon, Former Dean, College of Business and Economics, California State University Los Angeles, Chief Economist and Deputy Cabinet Secretary for former California Gov. Pete Wilson
 Mark Schuster - Founding Dean and CEO, Kaiser Permanente Bernard J. Tyson School of Medicine
 Yuyan Shi - Associate Professor of Health Economics at the University of California, San Diego, School of Public and Community Health.
  Neeraj Sood - Professor and vice dean for Faculty Affairs & Research at the USC Price School of Public Policy, and founding member of the USC Schaeffer Center. 
 Ragnhild Sohlberg – Deputy chair of the board, Peace Research Institute Oslo
 Connor Spreng – Executive Director, Swiss Academy of Development. Former Senior Economist, World Bank
 Bradley Stein - Director of the Opioid Policy, Tools, and Information Center (OPTIC) and Senior Physician Policy Researcher at the RAND Corporation.
 Mike Thirtle – Former president and chief executive officer, Bethesda Lutheran Communities
 Kenneth E. Thorpe - Robert W. Woodruff Professor and Chair of the Department of Health Policy and Management, Emory University former Deputy Assistant Secretary for Health Policy in the United States Department of Health and Human Services from 1993 to 1995.
 Anna-Marie Vilamovska – Former Secretary for Innovation Policy, Republic of Bulgaria. Awarded the Commander Cross of the Order of Merit of the Republic of Poland for outstanding contributions to the development of Polish-Bulgarian cooperation.
 Robert Otto Valdez - Director of the Agency for Healthcare Research and Quality and Robert Wood Johnson Foundation Professor Emeritus of Family & Community Medicine and Economics at the University of New Mexico.
 Ben Vollaard - Associate Professor of Economics and Director of the Fraud Detection and Corruption Lab at Tilburg University. 
 Zhen Wang - Professor of Health Services Research, Mayo Clinic
 Casey Wardynski - Former Assistant Secretary of the Army (Manpower and Reserve Affairs).
 C. Jason Wang - Professor of Pediatrics and Health Policy, director of the Center for Policy, Outcomes, and Prevention, Stanford University.
 Jeffrey Wasserman – Former vice-president and director of RAND Health, RAND Corporation

References

External links

Educational institutions established in 1970
RAND Corporation
Universities and colleges in Los Angeles County, California
Public policy schools
Private universities and colleges in California